Jane Finch may refer to:

Jane and Finch, a neighbourhood in Toronto, Canada
Jane Colebrook (born 1957), British distance runner formerly known as Jane Finch